Monstera juliusii is a flowering plant in the arum family (Araceae). However, M. standleyana has green petioles, few fenestrations and thin leaves, while M. juliusii is characterized by mottled white petioles, frequent fenestrations at maturity and thick, leathery leaves. Mature plants have pinnatilobed leaves as long as 60 cm (24 in) and 30 cm (12 in) wide, with circular fenestrations close to the margins, and oval fenestrations near the midrib. The species is named after Julius Johnson, son of the artists Rashid Johnson and Sheree Hovsepian.

Distribution 
This plant is native to Costa Rica.

References 

juliusii
Endemic flora of Costa Rica
Plants described in 2020